Bacchisa venusta is a species of beetle in the family Cerambycidae. It was described by Pascoe in 1867. It is known from the Moluccas.

References

V
Beetles described in 1867